Manuel Correa was a Portuguese nobleman. The island of Salsette in Bombay was divided into Malar and Marol  and granted for three years to Manuel Correa along with Cosme Correa and João Rodrigues Dantas.

References
Origin of Bombay, p. 96

History of Mumbai
16th-century Portuguese people